Thomas Sackville may refer to:

Thomas Sackville I (c.1336-1406), MP, see Knights of Buckinghamshire 1377-1394
Thomas Sackville II (died 1432), in 1394 MP for Sussex (UK Parliament constituency)
Thomas Sackville, 1st Earl of Dorset (1536–1608), English statesman, poet and playwright
Tom Sackville (born 1950), British Conservative Member of Parliament